UN numbers from UN3501 to UN3600 as assigned by the United Nations Committee of Experts on the Transport of Dangerous Goods are as follows:


UN 3501 to UN 3600

See also 
Lists of UN numbers

External links
ADR Registry for UN Numbers, cited on 11 February 2015.
United Nations Dangerous Goods Transport, cited on 11 February 2015.
List of United Nations Dangerous Goods in 2015, cited on 1 April 2015.
List of United Nations Dangerous Goods in 2013, cited on 1 April 2015.
Volume I of the United Nations Recommendations 2016, cited on 3 October 2016.
Volume I of the United Nations Recommendations 2017, cited on 21 September 2018.
Volume I of the United Nations Recommendations 2021, cited on 20 March 2022.

Lists of UN numbers